Virág Csurgó (born 10 November 1972) is a retired Hungarian tennis player.

Csurgó won six singles and 17 doubles titles on the ITF Circuit in her career. On 20 November 1995, she reached her best singles ranking of world No. 160. On 21 September 1998, she peaked at No. 84 in the WTA doubles rankings.

Csurgó reached the second round in both women's singles and doubles at the 1996 Summer Olympics. She wasn't originally entered in the singles event but was added when another competitor had to withdraw at the last minute. With only five minutes to take the court, she arrived at the match wearing her practice shorts and a T-shirt, and went on to defeat Aleksandra Olsza before falling to Kimiko Date in the second round.

Csurgó also reached the second round in three Grand Slam doubles tournaments. She made 16 appearances for the Hungary Fed Cup team.

ITF finals

Singles: 8 (6–2)

Doubles: 29 (17–12)

References

External links
 
 
 

1972 births
Living people
People from Siófok
Hungarian female tennis players
Tennis players at the 1996 Summer Olympics
Olympic tennis players of Hungary
Universiade medalists in tennis
Universiade bronze medalists for Hungary
Sportspeople from Somogy County